Ittner is a surname. Notable people with the surname include:

Alfred Ittner (1907–1976), SS functionary of Nazi Germany
Anthony F. Ittner (1837–1931), US-Politician and brick manufacturer
Chester Ittner Bliss (1899-1979), American statisticians
Eva-Maria Ittner (born 1961), German fencer
Martin Ittner (1870–?), American chemists
William B. Ittner (1864–1936), American architect

References

Surnames from given names